The Ultimate Collection is a compilation album from Elaine Paige, released on 12 May 2014 by Rhino UK/Warner Music UK to celebrate her 50th anniversary in show business.

Overview
The career-spanning retrospective features songs released between 1978 and 2011, including original hit recordings from Paige's most iconic roles in musical theatre, her favourite LP and single tracks, plus a recently commissioned remix by hit-makers Almighty. The compilation also notably features previously unreleased songs "It's Raining on Prom Night" and "What a Feeling" from the Warner Music vaults – both songs were out-takes from studio albums Paige released during the 1980s.

Promotion
On 16 May 2014, Paige was a guest on the ITV breakfast show This Morning and later on the day she appeared on the Sky News channel to promote her upcoming farewell tour, The Elaine Paige Show and The Ultimate Collection. In addition to this, she gave a few interviews for the British magazines, including gay magazine The Attitude and Woman's Weekly. Information about the release of this compilation also appeared in a number of TV guides, including TV Times, Total TV Guide and TV & Satellite Week.

In June 2014, Paige appeared on the cover of Saga Magazine. The Gay Times also published an interview with her in June issue.

Commercial performance
The album was released in the United Kingdom on 12 May 2014 and debuted at number 76 on the Official Albums Chart UK Top 100 with 1,225 copies sold in the first week.

Track listing 
The track listing for the album was announced on 9 April 2014 via Elaine Paige's official website. The standard edition has 20 tracks and was released on a single CD and worldwide via digital download.

A limited edition 2CD version was also released containing the original album plus a bonus CD of Paige's favourite A and B-side singles (released between 1980 and 2010) – the bonus CD features 4 rare singles which debuted on CD format ("Oh Major", "My Knight in Black Leather", "Rocking" and "He's a Dream").

Personnel
Credits adapted from the liner notes of the standard edition of The Ultimate Collection.

 Elaine Paige – lead vocals, executive producer of compilation
 Stuart Wheeley – Rhino project management
 Stephen Munns – compilation producer
 Jessica Bound – project assistant
 Kathy Kelly – licensing
 Stephen Munns – artwork direction
 Johnathan Elliott of Mental Block – artwork design
 Redlight Studios – mastering
 Stephen Munns, Clair Corbey & Seb Lassandro – research
 Michael Childers – photography
 Tony Visconti – record producer 
 Andrew Lloyd Webber and Tim Rice – record producers 
 Andrew Lloyd Webber – record producer 
 Mike Batt – record producer 
 Benny Andersson, Tim Rice & Björn Ulvaeus – record producers 
 Mike Moran – record producer 
 Anthony Pugh – record producer 
 Andrew Lloyd Webber and Nigel Wright – record producers 
 Phil Ramone and Barry Manilow – record producers 
 Tommy Krasker and Philip Chaffin – record producers 
 Ted Carfrae – mix engineer 
 Almighty – additional production and remix

Release history

References

External links

 
 Elaine Paige – The Ultimate Collection

2014 compilation albums
Albums produced by Tony Visconti
Albums produced by Andrew Lloyd Webber
Albums produced by Tim Rice
Elaine Paige albums
Warner Records compilation albums
Rhino Entertainment compilation albums
Albums produced by Nigel Wright